Kahuku is a census-designated place (CDP) in Honolulu, Hawaii, United States. In the Hawaiian language, ka huku means "the projection", presumably a reference to Kahuku Point nearby, the northernmost point of land on the island of Oahu. As of the 2010 Census, Kahuku had a population of 2,614.

Geography 
This community is located northwest from Laie and east from Kuilima and Kawela Bay along Kamehameha Highway (Route 83).

The total area is 57.46% water, the Pacific Ocean lying off the coast in the census tract.

Climate

Demographics 

As of the census of 2000, there were 2,097 people, 509 households, and 401 families residing in the CDP. The racial makeup of the CDP was 11.06% White, 0.29% Black or African American, 0.14% Native American, 26.85% Asian, 27.28% Pacific Islander, 1.05% from other races, and 33.33% from two or more races.  8.63% of the population were Hispanic or Latino of any race.

There were 509 households, out of which 43.2% had children under the age of 18 living with them, 59.3% were married couples living together, 14.3% had a female householder with no husband present, and 21.2% were non-families. 19.8% of all households were made up of individuals, and 11.0% had someone living alone who was 65 years of age or older.  The average household size was 3.96 and the average family size was 4.63.

In the CDP the population was spread out, with 35.4% under the age of 18, 10.7% from 18 to 24, 23.3% from 25 to 44, 17.8% from 45 to 64, and 12.7% who were 65 years of age or older.  The median age was 28 years.  For every 100 females, there were 101.2 males.  For every 100 females age 18 and over, there were 96.9 males.

The median income for a household in the CDP was $39,135, and the median income for a family was $47,045. Males had a median income of $29,934 versus $22,366 for females. The per capita income for the CDP was $12,340.  14.6% of the population and 11.8% of families were below the poverty line.  Out of the total population, 17.4% of those under the age of 18 and 17.7% of those 65 and older were living below the poverty line.

Areas of interest
The ZIP Code for Kahuku is 96731. In the mid-1970s a popular television game show, The Diamond Head Game, was contested on the grounds of Del Webb's Kuilima Hotel (today the Turtle Bay Resort), located just to the west. At the end of each show the announcer would say, "If you plan to be in Hawaii, send a self-addressed, stamped envelope to the Diamond Head Game, Kahuku, Oahu 96731." The Fox TV series North Shore was filmed there in 2004.

Kahuku is also home to one of the few remaining family-owned farms in the area: Kahuku Farms. Educational tours are given several times a week, though private tours can be scheduled in advance. The farm also runs a small farm-to-table cafe.

Places of interest in the area include beaches, hiking, fishing, art galleries, and several shrimp trucks in the vicinity.

Kahuku football

Many of the people in the Kahuku community and in the football community have Samoan or Tongan roots and high school football has become quite important to them. 
Kahuku High School in this small, rural, coastal town on the North Shore of Oahu has produced some of the best football players in the United States. The players are regularly scouted by American colleges and universities. Many end up playing professionally for the National Football League.

Government and infrastructure
The Honolulu Police Department operates the Kahuku Substation in Kahuku.

Education

The Hawaii Department of Education operates the public schools. Kahuku Elementary School and Kahuku High & Intermediate School are located in Kahuku CDP.

References

External links

 
 Kahuku High School

Census-designated places in Honolulu County, Hawaii
Populated places on Oahu
Populated coastal places in Hawaii